Border G-Man is a 1938 American adventure film directed by David Howard and written by Oliver Drake. The film stars George O'Brien, Laraine Day, Ray Whitley, John Miljan and Rita La Roy. The film was released on June 24, 1938, by RKO Pictures.

Plot
Jim Galloway, posing as a ranch foreman, is sent to investigate a suspicion that ammunition, horses and men are being smuggled out of the country  and becomes involved in a mystery and a romance.

Cast 
 George O'Brien as Jim Galloway
 Laraine Day as Betty Holden
 Ray Whitley as Luke Jones
 John Miljan as Louis Rankin
 Rita La Roy as Mrs. Rita Browning
 Edgar Dearing as Smoky Joslin
 William Stelling as Leslie Holden
 Edward Keane as Colonel Christie
 Ethan Laidlaw as Henchman Curly
 Hugh Sothern as Matt Rathburn
 Bob Burns as Sheriff Clemens

References

External links 
 
 
 
 

1938 films
American black-and-white films
RKO Pictures films
Films directed by David Howard
1938 adventure films
Films produced by Bert Gilroy
American adventure films
1930s English-language films
1930s American films
English-language adventure films